Lars Andersen may refer to:

Lars Andersen (archer) (born 1964), Danish archer and a speed world record holder
Lars Andersen (captain), namesake of Andersen Island
Lars Andersen (footballer), Danish footballer in 2008–09 Danish Cup
Lars Håkon Andersen (born 1974), Norwegian ice hockey player
Lars Hedegaard Andersen (born 1975), Danish cricketer

See also
Lars Anderson (disambiguation)